Jean Fernandez (born 8 October 1954) is a French professional football manager and former player. He has previously managed Metz and Marseille, where France national team star Franck Ribéry saw him as a mentor. He managed Auxerre for five years, and was named as France's manager of the year in the 2009–10 season after guiding Auxerre into the UEFA Champions League. He managed Nancy for the 2011 season and half of the 2012 season. Jean Fernandez resigned from his position with Nancy before the end of the 2013 season on 10 January 2013. He became the new Montpellier manager on 1 July 2013, but departed on 5 December that year after a run of seven games without a win.

Fernandez was born in Mostaganem, French Algeria.  He competed for France at the 1976 Summer Olympics.

Honours
Marseille
UEFA Intertoto Cup: 2005

References

Living people
1954 births
Association football midfielders
French footballers
French people of Spanish descent
Olympique de Marseille players
FC Girondins de Bordeaux players
AS Cannes players
Ligue 1 players
Olympic footballers of France
Footballers at the 1976 Summer Olympics
French football managers
AS Cannes managers
OGC Nice managers
Olympique de Marseille managers
Lille OSC managers
Étoile Sportive du Sahel managers
FC Sochaux-Montbéliard managers
AJ Auxerre managers
FC Metz managers
AS Nancy Lorraine managers
Ligue 1 managers
Ligue 2 managers
People from Mostaganem
AS Béziers Hérault (football) players
Al Nassr FC managers
Al Shabab FC (Riyadh) managers
Al-Wehda Club (Mecca) managers
Montpellier HSC managers
Al-Khor SC managers
Al-Gharafa SC managers
Pieds-Noirs
Mediterranean Games silver medalists for France
Mediterranean Games medalists in football
Competitors at the 1975 Mediterranean Games